Shapes That Go Together is a song by Norwegian band A-ha.

Background
When a new A-ha album did not appear, and solo albums began to be released, it was feared that this was to be A-ha's last song. Ironically entitled "Shapes That Go Together", there was a significant amount of discord within the band at the time of the song's release.

This single was the official song of the Paralympics '94 which was held at Lillehammer, Norway. The single was written by Magne Furuholmen and Pål Waaktaar, who from now onwards refers to himself as Paul Waaktaar-Savoy, produced by Christopher Neil and arranged by A-ha and Kjetil Bjerkestrand.

This song was released in February 1994. It reached #27 on the charts in the UK, and was in the charts for three weeks total. Also reached #57 in Germany, #28 in Poland and #15 in Denmark.

The band performed the song at the 1994 IRMA Awards in Dublin.

The single was not released on an album until 10 years later, when it was placed onto The Singles: 1984-2004 hits album and a year later appearing on the UK version The Definitive Singles Collection 1984-2004 which is practically the same album with just a few track differences. The song, as well as its B-side "Cold As Stone", is also placed in the new compilation 25.

The German-made disc is silver and green depicting the Paralympics emblem, while the A-ha-logo and track listings are printed in white letters. It has sold 275,000 copies worldwide.

The second 5" CD-single is a limited edition numbered CD. It comes in an album style case with a card insert. The front is in various shades of pinks and purples instead of greens and blues, but has the same cover design. It contains three 4½" × 4½" photographic prints, one of each band member (taken from the video "Dark Is The Night"). The spine is black with white titles. The CD is silver `matte effect' with black titles and A-ha-logo. The back cover of the CD is black with white text and has the same group picture as on the back of the 7".

Track listing

7": Warner Bros. Records / W0236 (Europe) 
Side one
 "Shapes That Go Together" - 4:13
Side two
 "Cold As Stone (Re-mix)" - 4:32

CD: Warner Bros. Records / WO236CD (Europe) 
 "Shapes That Go Together" - 4:15
 "Cold As Stone (Re-mix)" - 4:33
 "Shapes That Go Together (Instr. Version)" - 4:24

Limited Edition CD: Warner Bros. Records / W0236CDX (Europe) 
 "Shapes That Go Together" - 4:13
 "Slender Frame (Live)" - 4:05
 "Touchy! (Live)" - 6:46
 "Rolling Thunder (Live)" - 6:13

The "Cold As Stone" remix on the standard CD release was originally created as a potential follow-up to the "Lie Down In Darkness" single in the US.  Unfortunately that single did not chart, so this was the only known release of the remix until the 2010 compilation "25" was released.

The live tracks on the limited edition CD are taken from the video Live In South America.

Music video
The music video to "Shapes That Go Together" is directed by Barry Maguire. It was a simple Black and White Studio film with Sepia tones, it is also one of the few times you see a backing band with drummer and bass player.

The video is commercially available in "25" Compilation album.

Charts

References

1994 singles
A-ha songs
Songs written by Magne Furuholmen
Songs written by Paul Waaktaar-Savoy
Song recordings produced by Christopher Neil
Warner Records singles
1994 songs